William Hewitt Baker (April 29, 1831 – February 11, 1910) was a U.S. Representative from Kansas.

Personal life 
Born near Centerville, Washington County, Pennsylvania, Baker attended public school and graduated from Waynesboro College in 1856. He married Philena Griffith in Washington County, PA. on November 25, 1858. They had 3 sons and 5 daughters. In 1878, he moved to Lincoln County, Kansas, where he engaged in agricultural pursuits and stock raising. He died in Lincoln, Kansas at 4:15 p.m., February 11, 1910 and was interred in Lincoln Center Cemetery. His obituary was published in the Lincoln Sentinel, February 10, 1910.

Career 
Baker was a teacher and moved to Iowa in 1859 to become the principal of the public schools in Council Bluffs. Baker studied law, was admitted to the bar in 1860, but never practiced. In 1865, he returned to Beallsville, Pennsylvania. From 1865–1878, he engaged in mercantile pursuits.

A Populist, Baker was elected to the Fifty-second, Fifty-third, and Fifty-fourth Congresses (March 4, 1891 – March 3, 1897). He was not a candidate for re-nomination in 1896, and he resumed agricultural pursuits.

References

External links

1831 births
1910 deaths
People from Washington County, Pennsylvania
Kansas Populists
People's Party members of the United States House of Representatives from Kansas
19th-century American politicians
People from Lincoln Center, Kansas
Members of the United States House of Representatives from Kansas